Salvia fulgens, the Cardinal sage or Mexican scarlet sage, is a species of flowering plant native to the Mexican mountains adjacent to the state of Puebla, growing at 8,700-11,000 ft elevation. It prefers the edge of oak and coniferous woodlands, especially in clearings of Abies religiosa. The mountains receive fog and rain nearly year-round.

Description
The upper lip has red hairs which glisten (fulgens) in the morning dew. A reddish-brown calyx remains long after the flowers drop. Inflorescences are usually about 4 in long, though occasionally a 12 in inflorescence appears. The heart-shaped leaves are pale yellow-green, about 1.5 in long by 1 in wide, and cover the plant quite profusely.

It was introduced into Western horticulture in the 19th century.  It has been grown in Britain for many years. It has gained the Royal Horticultural Society's Award of Garden Merit.

References

fulgens
Flora of Mexico
Taxa named by Antonio José Cavanilles